Casgrain is a French Canadian surname. Notable people with the surname include:

 Charles Eusèbe Casgrain, Ontario physician and political figure
 Charles-Eusèbe Casgrain, lawyer and political figure in Lower Canada
 Henri-Raymond Casgrain, French Canadian Roman Catholic priest, author, and publisher
 Joseph Philippe Baby Casgrain, Quebec surveyor, civil engineer and political figure
 Léon Casgrain, Canadian politician
 Philippe Baby Casgrain, Quebec lawyer, author and political figure
 Pierre-François Casgrain,  Canadian politician and Speaker of the Canadian House of Commons
 Thérèse Casgrain, feminist, reformer, politician and senator

See also
 Marie-Claire Kirkland-Casgrain, first woman elected to the Legislative Assembly of Québec
 Thomas Chase-Casgrain, French Canadian lawyer